This is a List of Juan dela Cruz episodes.

Series overview 
{| class="wikitable plainrowheaders" style="text-align: center;"
|- class="wikitable" style="text-align: center;"
! style="padding: 0 8px;" colspan="2"| Month
! style="padding: 0 8px;" | Episodes
! style="padding: 0 8px;" | Peak
! style="padding: 0 8px;" | Average Rating
! style="padding: 0 8px;" | Rank
|-
|style="padding: 0 8px; background:#784322;"| 
| ' style="padding: 0 8px;" |February 2013
| style="padding: 0 8px;" |19
| style="padding: 0 8px;" |42.6%  (Episode 14)
| style="padding: 0 8px;" |37.9%
| style="padding: 0 8px;" |#2
|-
|style="padding: 0 8px; background:#be3515;"| 
| ' style="padding: 0 8px;" |March 2013
| style="padding: 0 8px;" |19
| style="padding: 0 8px;" |37.7%  (Episode 26)
| style="padding: 0 8px;" |35.7%
| style="padding: 0 8px;" |#1
|-
|style="padding: 0 8px; background:#c2b700;"| 
| ' style="padding: 0 8px;" |April 2013
| style="padding: 0 8px;" |22
| style="padding: 0 8px;" |35.8%  (Episode 45)
| style="padding: 0 8px;" |33.4%
| style="padding: 0 8px;" |#1
|-
|style="padding: 0 8px; background:#2400a8;"| 
| ' style="padding: 0 8px;" |May 2013
| style="padding: 0 8px;" |23
| style="padding: 0 8px;" |35.7%  (Episode 67)
| style="padding: 0 8px;" |33.3%
| style="padding: 0 8px;" |#1
|-
|style="padding: 0 8px; background:#067b09;"| 
| ' style="padding: 0 8px;" |June 2013
| style="padding: 0 8px;" |20
| style="padding: 0 8px;" |38.1%  (Episode 93)
| style="padding: 0 8px;" |34.0%
| style="padding: 0 8px;" |#3
|-
|style="padding: 0 8px; background:#22300c;"| 
| ' style="padding: 0 8px;" |July 2013
| style="padding: 0 8px;" |23
| style="padding: 0 8px;" |36.5%  (Episode 125)
| style="padding: 0 8px;" |34.9%
| style="padding: 0 8px;" |#2
|-
|style="padding: 0 8px; background:#8203d2;"| 
| ' style="padding: 0 8px;" |August 2013
| style="padding: 0 8px;" |22
| style="padding: 0 8px;" |38.1%  (Episode 137)
| style="padding: 0 8px;" |35.9%
| style="padding: 0 8px;" |#1
|-
|style="padding: 0 8px; background:#0481b5;"| 
| ' style="padding: 0 8px;" |September 2013
| style="padding: 0 8px;" |21
| style="padding: 0 8px;" |34.9%  (Episode 154)
| style="padding: 0 8px;" |33.2%
| style="padding: 0 8px;" |#2
|-
|style="padding: 0 8px; background:#686158;"| 
| ' style="padding: 0 8px;" |October 2013
| style="padding: 0 8px;" |19
| style="padding: 0 8px;" |38.3%  (Finale Episode)
| style="padding: 0 8px;" |34.5%
| style="padding: 0 8px;" |#1

|}

Episodes

February 2013

March 2013

April 2013

May 2013

June 2013

July 2013

August 2013

September 2013

October 2013

References

External links 
 
 

Lists of Philippine drama television series episodes